Robert Bobby George is an athletics coach from Kerala, India. In 2004, he received Dronacharya Award, India's highest award for sports coaching.

Biography
Robert Bobby George was born in Kannur district of Kerala, one of the ten children of Kodakachira George Joseph and Mary Joseph. He completed his engineering degree from College of Engineering, Trivandrum, 1991 batch.

Bobby married Anju in 2000. Couple have two children Aaron and Andriya.

Career
Bobby George was a former national champion in triple jump. He is best known as the coach of his wife and long jump medalist Anju Bobby George. A mechanical engineer, Bobby quit his job in 1998 to become Anju's full-time coach. 

In 2018, Bobby was appointed as 'high performance specialist coach' for India.

Anju and Bobby started their athletics training academy named Anju Bobby George Academy in Bangalore, Karnataka under Anju Bobby Sports Foundation.

Awards
In 2003, he received the Dronacharya Award.

References

Living people
Year of birth missing (living people)
Recipients of the Dronacharya Award
Indian athletics coaches
Athletes from Kerala
People from Idukki district